Ann Hutchinson Guest  ( Hutchinson; 3 November 1918 – 9 April 2022) was an American authority on dance notation and movement analysis, long based in the United Kingdom. She studied more than 80 dance notation systems and translated 20 to Labanotation. This gave her access to a number of dance works in their original version – such as Vaslav Nijinsky's L'Après-midi d'un Faune. Her extensive research, performing and teaching career led her to establish the Language of Dance approach to movement understanding.

Career 
Hutchinson Guest studied labanotation with Sigurd Leeder at Dartington Hall in England in the 1930s and trained in modern dance and ballet. In New York, she co-founded and directed the Dance Notation Bureau, danced on Broadway and taught at the Juilliard School.

Awards and honours 
For her contribution to dance research and education, Hutchinson Guest was awarded two honorary doctorates as well as many lifetime achievement awards. In 1997, she received the "Outstanding Contribution to Dance Research" award from the Congress on Research in Dance (CORD). In 1998, she was awarded a Guggenheim Fellowship for Dance Studies.

In 2021, Hutchinson Guest was appointed an honorary Member of the Most Excellent Order of the British Empire (MBE) by Queen Elizabeth II. It was made substantive in 2022 shortly before her death, indicating she had taken British nationality.

Personal life and death 
Ann Hutchinson Guest was born on 3 November 1918, in New York City. She spent most of her childhood growing up in England. She returned to the United States when she turned 21. In the 1940s, she had a brief marriage with Ricky Trent, a trumpeter she had met while performing in One Touch of Venus. In 1962, she married dance historian Ivor Forbes Guest and they remained together until his death in 2018.

Hutchinson Guest died on 9 April 2022 at her home in London, aged 103.

Works

See also 

 Motif description
 Labanotation

References 

1918 births
2022 deaths
American centenarians
American female dancers
American expatriates in England
British centenarians
British female dancers
Dance notators
Broadway theatre people
Members of the Order of the British Empire
Women centenarians
Writers from New York City